Tofieldia is a small genus of flowering plants described as a genus in 1778. It is widespread across much of Europe, Asia, and North America.

Tofieldia was once placed in the lily family, but now generally included in the newer family Tofieldiaceae. The genus sometimes includes species of genus Triantha. Tofieldia are rhizomatous perennial herbs with spikes or racemes of lily-like flowers.

The name Tofieldia commemorates the British botanist Thomas Tofield.

Species
 Tofieldia calyculata (L.) Wahlenb. - much of Europe from Spain to Ukraine
 Tofieldia cernua Sm. - Siberia + Russian Far East
 Tofieldia coccinea Richardson - Russia, Mongolia, China, Japan, Korea, Alaska, Canada
 Tofieldia divergens Bureau & Franch. - China (Guizhou, Sichuan, Yunnan)
 Tofieldia furusei (Hiyama) M.N.Tamura & Fuse - Honshu
 Tofieldia glabra Nutt. - North and South Carolina
 Tofieldia himalaica Baker - Nepal, Bhutan, Sikkim, Arunachal Pradesh
 Tofieldia × hybrida A.Kern. ex Asch. & Graebn. - Austrian and Italian Alps
 Tofieldia nuda Maxim. - Honshu, Kyushu
 Tofieldia okuboi Makino - Japan, Kuril Islands
 Tofieldia pusilla (Michx.) Pers. - Subarctic + Subalpine Europe, Asia and North America
 Tofieldia thibetica Franch. - Guizhou, Sichuan, Yunnan
 Tofieldia yoshiiana Makino - Korea, Japan

References

External links
Jepson Manual: Tofieldia
USDA Plants Profile

Tofieldiaceae
Alismatales genera